Joyce Hilster (born 1 June 1983, Naarden) is a Dutch team handball player. She plays on the Dutch national team, and participated at the 2011 World Women's Handball Championship in Brazil. She ended her career in 2013 at Bayer Leverkusen.

References

External links

1983 births
Living people
Dutch female handball players
People from Naarden
Sportspeople from North Holland
21st-century Dutch women